Yael Nahar, better known by his stage name CMC$ (an abbreviation for See Me Counting Stacks, pronounced "CMCS"), is a Dutch musician, DJ and record producer. He gained recognition for his collaboration with DVBBS titled "Not Going Home".

Career 
Nahar produces various musical styles including hip-hop, R&B, soul combined with bubbling, moombahton and house. He went to Herman Brood Academie production school together with fellow Dutch DJ Martin Garrix. He has released music on Spinnin' Records, Mad Decent and Barong Family. His first single "Wake Up Call" reached number four on the iTunes charts. With Kriss Kross Amsterdam he launched a "running track" collaboration between Spotify and Spinnin' Records. He produces future bass, trap and future pop.

He collaborated with DVBBS to release "Not Going Home" as a single, featuring vocalist Gia Koka. In 2017, he released "Keys" as a single, featuring vocals by Jalise Romy. On the 10th of August 2018 he released his long-awaited collaboration with GRX (Martin Garrix) and Swedish singers Icona Pop. The track is in the style ‘Future Bass’ and is CMC$’s most common genre of music. He is mostly know in his homeland but also in the United Kingdom because of his father, who was born and raised in Douglas.

Discography

Singles

As lead artist

As featured artist

Remixes

2015 
 Lady Bee featuring Rochelle – "Return of the Mack" (CMC$ Remix)
 Kris Kross Amsterdam and Choco – "Until The Morning" (CMC$ Remix)

2018 
 Martin Garrix and David Guetta (featuring Jamie Scott and Romy Dya) - "So Far Away"  (CMC$ Remix)

2019 
 CMC$ – "Time Machine" (CMC$ and B3rror VIP Edit)

References 

Dutch electronic musicians
DJs from Amsterdam
Living people
Stmpd Rcrds artists
Mad Decent artists
Electronic dance music DJs
Year of birth missing (living people)